Victor M. Hansen is an American lawyer and military officer, and a professor of law at the New England School of Law, in Boston.

Hansen is notable for his wide publications on military justice and the treatment of captives held in extrajudicial detention by the Bush Presidency.

Publications

References

New England Law Boston faculty
Living people
Year of birth missing (living people)